The Ministry of Infrastructure and Transport is a government department of Greece headquartered in Cholargos, Athens.

The current minister is Giorgos Gerapetritis in the Cabinet of Kyriakos Mitsotakis.

History

The ministry is the successor of the old Ministry of Transport and Communications (Υπουργείο Μεταφορών και Επικοινωνιών), with which the public works portfolio of the Ministry for the Environment, Physical Planning and Public Works was merged on 7 October 2009. A further merger with the Ministry of Development and Competitiveness created the Ministry of Development, Competitiveness, Infrastructure, Transport and Networks on 21 June 2012, but this was reversed on 25 June 2013.

List of ministers

Ministers for Transport and Communications

Ministers for Infrastructure, Transport and Networks (2009–2012)

Minister for Development, Competitiveness, Infrastructure, Transport and Networks (2012–2013)

Minister for Infrastructure, Transport and Networks (2013-2015)

Alternate Minister for Infrastructure, Transport and Networks (2015)

Minister for Infrastructure, Transport and Networks (2015–2016)

Ministers for Infrastructure and Transport (since 2016)

Subordinate agencies
 Air Accident Investigation and Aviation Safety Board

References

External links

 Ministry website

Infrastructure and Transport
Transport organizations based in Greece
Infrastructure and Transport
Greece
Greece
Greece
Greece